Amy Lamé (née Caddle; born 3 January 1971) is an American-British performer, writer, and TV and radio presenter, known for her one-woman shows, her performance group Duckie, and LGBT-themed media works.

She was appointed by the Mayor of London, Sadiq Khan, as the city's first "Night Czar" in November 2016, with the responsibility of promoting London's varied nightlife both in the UK and internationally, including safeguarding venues across the city.

Biography
Amy Lamé was born and raised in Keyport, New Jersey, and moved to London in 1992.

She is married to Jennie, her partner since 1995.

Career

Radio
Lamé presented alongside Danny Baker on BBC London's afternoon show which aired 3–5pm from Monday to Friday. On 1 November 2012, it was reported by Danny Baker that the show had been axed and that Lamé earned £50 per episode.

She was the co-founder and co-presenter of HomoLab, a weekly queer cultural and current affairs podcast, which ran from December 2010 to June 2014.

Having sat in for a number of DJs on BBC Radio 6 Music (including Tom Ravenscroft, Lauren Laverne, Nemone, and Steve Lamacq), Lamé began hosting her own weekly Sunday show on the station from January 2018, replacing Jarvis Cocker's Sunday Service.

TV
Lamé was a presenter on the BBC 2 show GaytimeTV for 3 series and then went on to create and host her own panel game-show, The Staying in Show for Channel 4. Lamé has appeared on ITV reality show Celebrity Fit Club. She was a panellist on Loose Women in 2004 and CelebAir, and on Market Kitchen. She was the mentor for LGBTQ teenagers on Channel 4's My Big Gay Prom.

In 2009, she appeared in a Doctor Who related documentary titled Look 100 Years Younger, included on the DVD release for The Twin Dilemma, in which she discussed with actor Colin Baker the various costumes worn by the character of the Doctor over the decades. In 2012 she appeared on Channel 4's live satirical comedy/news programme 10 O'Clock Live to discuss the current state of the National Health Service.

Writing
Lamé has contributed short stories to the anthology Typical Girls. She also writes regular features on culture, travel and food for The Times.

Duckie and other works
In 1995, Lamé, with Simon Strange, co-founded the Olivier-award-winning performance-club-night and collective Duckie, which she hosts every Saturday night at The Royal Vauxhall Tavern. In 1996 she curated, produced and hosted Keep The Faith at Tate Britain which explored the links between the gallery's permanent collection and faith. She commissioned new work to be shown in the gallery for one night only including an interactive performance installation tea party with 30 Anglican priests; Joshua Sofaer's tale of meeting his Jews for Jesus missionary namesake, Joshua Sofaer, in Namesake: The Story of a Name; Jonathan Allen/Tommy Angel's performance exploring evangelism and belief using magic and illusion; and a Buddhist tour of the gallery. The event had the highest ever recorded number of participants – over 5,000 – for a Late at Tate.

In 1996, her second one-woman show, Cum Manifesto, a show about safer sex for gay men, debuted on Hampstead Heath and toured to gay male cruising grounds around the UK and Scandinavia. Working with the Duckie collective in 1997, Lamé produced and hosted The World's First Lesbian Beauty Contest.

In 2006, Lamé created her third one-woman show Amy Lamé's Mama Cass Family Singers. The show debuted at the Edinburgh Fringe Festival and was later performed at the Soho Theatre, London, toured the UK and performed at The Powerhouse, Brisbane, Australia

She made her stage debut in her first one-woman show Gay Man Trapped in a Lesbian's Body as part of ICA London's 'Spring Exhibitions' programme.

She founded the social enterprise Pom Pom International and has held pom-pom making parties at Duckie, London's Lesbian and Gay Festival 2008 and in Northern Ireland where she held the 'Pom-poms for Peace Project'.

Politics
Lamé is an active member of, and fundraiser for, the Labour Party.

She is mentioned in Sarah Brown's memoir Behind the Black Door (2011), where she details Lamé's hen night celebrations in Downing Street.

From May 2010 to May 2011, she held the ceremonial role of Mayoress of Camden alongside the Mayor, Councillor Jonathan Simpson.

In 2014, Lamé sought nomination to be the Labour candidate for the South London seat of Dulwich and West Norwood. She was unsuccessful, losing to Helen Hayes.

On 4 November 2016, Lamé was announced by London Mayor Sadiq Khan to be the first London night czar. She earns a salary of £116,925 per year for the role. Shortly after her appointment she was praised by Khan for her role in negotiating the reopening of the Fabric nightclub.

In October 2018, Lamé successfully managed to lobby Waitrose to change the name of its Gentleman's Smoked Chicken Caesar Roll, after arguing that it was sexist.

Controversies

Shortly after her appointment in November 2016, Lamé was ordered to delete a number of offensive tweets about the Conservative Party, which included celebration of the death of Margaret Thatcher and fantasies of assaulting David Cameron and Sayeeda Warsi.

In July 2018, Lamé was criticised by prominent music industry figures such as Four Tet and Andy Peyton after Hackney Council voted to make new businesses close at 11pm under new licensing laws.

In March 2019, after live music venue The Social was saved from closing after a fundraising campaign, figures such as Andrew Boff called Amy Lamé's role as night czar into question, arguing that the position is an ineffective job and should be scrapped.

In February 2020, it emerged that Lamé was paid an extra £1,000 out of Mayor of London Sadiq Khan's culture budget to host a drag act at Walthamstow Assembly Hall, which charged a £15 entry fee.

References

External links

Amy Lamé (BBC Radio 6 Music)
Amy Lamé interview
HomoLab website
Pom Pom International website

1971 births
Living people
People from Keyport, New Jersey
American emigrants to England
American women podcasters
American podcasters
American Episcopalians
American radio DJs
American television hosts
American lesbian actresses
English lesbian actresses
Lesbian comedians
English LGBT broadcasters
Naturalised citizens of the United Kingdom
English Anglicans
English podcasters
British women podcasters
English radio personalities
English television presenters
British women television presenters
LGBT people from New Jersey
BBC Radio 6 Music presenters
American women radio presenters
American women television presenters
Labour Party (UK) officials
English LGBT politicians
20th-century LGBT people
21st-century LGBT people
American LGBT comedians
English LGBT comedians